Khursheed Kamal Aziz (
1927–2009) better known as K. K. Aziz, 
was a Pakistani historian, admired for his books written in the English Language. However, he also wrote Urdu prose and was a staunch believer in the importance of the Persian language to enhance one's knowledge about the world.

Early life and career
Khursheed Kamal Aziz was born on 11 December 1927 to Abdul Aziz, a barrister and a historian in his own right. He was born in a town called Ballamabad, Chiniot, Punjab, British India. He received his early education from M.B. High School in Batala, Punjab and then went to first Forman Christian College and finally to Government College Lahore for further studies where one of his professors was the famed Patras Bokhari. Later he completed his studies at Victoria University in Manchester, UK.

Aziz taught at various reputed institutions such as the University of Cambridge and University of Oxford, UK, and at universities in Heidelberg, Germany as well as in Khartoum, Sudan and the Punjab University in Lahore, Pakistan.
He also delivered occasional lectures at universities in Pakistan: Karachi, Peshawar, Islamabad; Bangladesh: Dacca; United Kingdom: Hull, New Castle upon Tyne and Oxford; Switzerland: Geneva and Bergen.

He worked briefly, in the early 1970s, as an advisor to Zulfikar Ali Bhutto and was the chairman of the 'National Commission on Historical and Cultural Research' but he later fell out with Zulfiqar Ali Bhutto and his regime and left that position. Some years later, he returned his "Sitara-i-Imtiaz" Award awarded by the President of Pakistan in protest of his treatment by the Martial Law authorities after General Zia-ul-Haq took over power in 1977 and was forced to leave the country. He lived many years abroad as an exile and taught at many universities abroad. He began to collect his research material for his many famous books while he was teaching in Germany. His research material was enriched by the experiences he had while living in many different countries abroad.

Death and legacy
He died in Lahore, Pakistan at the age of 81, on 15 July 2009. K. K. Aziz had returned from abroad to Lahore, Pakistan only in 2008, a year before his death. His wife, Zarina Aziz, said in an interview to a Pakistani newspaper, after his death, that he had been somewhat sick for about last 5 years but had continued to work for 10 hours daily to write and finish his books. He had written over 50 history books in his lifetime and used to say to her that his books were his children and would keep his name alive. In 2014, per a major Pakistani newspaper columnist, some young Pakistanis are starting to give K. K. Aziz credit for helping them have a balanced view of Pakistan's history. Now, at least, they got a chance to look at the history of Pakistan from a point of view other than the 'only slanted view laced with extreme ideological narratives' in the text books they studied at school and college. Pakistani people themselves and also the world at large, have the ability to sort out the truth, on individual basis, after reading many and different points of view on the history of Pakistan. Since the mid 1990s, some historians and intellectuals in Pakistan have slowly and surely tried to develop a more rational and balanced view of Pakistani history.

Literary works
Aziz had a profound love for words and writing. He authored 44 valuable books on the modern history of the Muslims of the Indian subcontinent. He had a unique style of writing that stimulated readers' thought process.
He wrote on many significant issues related to Pakistan and also came up with volumes of significant details on important dignitaries who helped in shaping the history of the Indian subcontinent.

Bibliography
Some of his books include:
 History of the Partition of India
 The Meaning of Islamic Art
 Public Life in Muslim India
 The Murder of History : A Critique of History Textbooks used in Pakistan (one of his famous works)- first edition in 1985, second edition in 1993
 The Making of Pakistan: A Study in Nationalism
 Studies in History and Politics
 Party Politics in Pakistan (1947–1958)
 Britain and Pakistan
 Muslims Under Congress Rule (1937–1939) - A documentary record
 British Imperialism in India
 Woh Hawadis Ashna
 The Partition of India and Emergence of Pakistan
 The Pakistani Historian (his autobiography)
 Rahmat Ali: A Biography
 British Imperialism in India 
 Punjab: A Historical Miscellany 
 The All India Muslim Conference (1928–1935): A Documentary Record
 Religion, Land and Politics in Pakistan: A Study of Piri-Muridi.
 Public Life in Muslim India (1850–1947) A Compendium of Basic Information on Political, Social, Religious, and Educational Organizations Active in Pre-Partition India.
 World Powers and the 1971 Breakup of Pakistan
 The Coffee House of Lahore: A Memoir (1942 – 57)
 A Journey into the Past: Portrait of a Punjabi Family (1800 - 1970)
 The Indian Khilafat Movement

See also

Some other major historians of Pakistan:
 Nabi Bakhsh Khan Baloch
 Mubarak Ali
 Ishtiaq Hussain Qureshi
 Hasan Askari Rizvi
 Rasul Baksh Rais
 Ayesha Siddiqa
 Sulaiman Nadvi
 Mahmud Hussain
 Ayesha Jalal
 Tariq Rahman

References

1927 births
2009 deaths
20th-century Pakistani historians
Historians of South Asia
Government College University, Lahore alumni
Forman Christian College alumni
Academic staff of the University of the Punjab
Academics of the University of Cambridge
English-language writers from Pakistan